Holland Sports Football Club is a football club based in the Hurst Green area of Oxted, Surrey, England. They are currently members of the Mid Sussex League Premier Division and play at Mill Lane.

History
The club was founded in 1929 and were then known as Holland Rovers. In 2008, they were founder members of the Surrey Elite Intermediate Football League but resigned mid-season and their records were expunged. For the 2011–12 season, the club successfully applied to join the Kent County League Division Two West. They were promoted to Division One West for the 2012–13 season due to league re-organisation. They went on to win the Division One West title at their first attempt, subsequently earning promotion to the Premier Division. In their first season in the Premier Division, the club achieved an 11th-place finish.

In August 2021, YouTube channel "Bunch of Amateurs" began a series based around the club named Holland Uncovered. The series follows the club and manager Peter Barkley and showcases what happens behind the scenes of a typical non-league English football club.

Ground
The club play at the Holland Sports & Social Club on Mill Lane in Oxted, Surrey.

Honours

Kent County League
Division One West champions, 2013–14

References

Football clubs in England
Football clubs in Surrey
Association football clubs established in 1929
1929 establishments in England
Kent County League
Surrey Elite Intermediate Football League